This is the complete list of Pan American Games medalists in cycling from 1951 to 2015.

Road cycling

Road race - Men's

Road race - Women's
The individual road race has been run every time since 1987.

Team race - Men's

Time trial - Men's

Time trial - Women's
The individual time trial was introduced in 1995, and has been run ever since.

Team time trial - Men's

Team time trial - Women's

Track cycling

Sprint - Men's

Sprint - Women's

Team sprint - Men's

Team sprint - Women's

Time trial - Men's

Time trial - Women's

Australian pursuit - Men's

Individual pursuit - Men's

Individual pursuit - Women's

Team pursuit - Men's

Team pursuit - Women's

Points race - Men's

Points race - Women's

Madison - Men's

Olympic sprint - Men's

Keirin - Men's
The individual road race has been run every time since 1999.

Keirin - Women's
The individual road race has been run every time since 2003.

Omnium - Men's
The individual road race has been run every time since 2011.

Omnium - Women's
The individual road race has been run every time since 2011.

Mountain biking

Men's

Women's

BMX

Men's
The BMX was introduced in 2007.

Women's
The BMX was introduced in 2007.

References

Cycling